Frankenblick is a municipality in the Sonneberg district of Thuringia, Germany.

Frankenblick was formed on 1 January 2012 by the merger of the former municipalities Effelder-Rauenstein and Mengersgereuth-Hämmern. Today, it consists of the districts Effelder, Rauenstein, Grümpen, Seltendorf, Rabenäußig, Rückerswind, Meschenbach, Döhlau and Mengersgereuth-Hämmern.

Gallery

References

Sonneberg (district)
Duchy of Saxe-Meiningen